Jhando Mari is a town and union council of Tando Allahyar District in the Sindh Province of Pakistan. The union council has a population of 30,384.

See also
 Ramapir Temple Tando Allahyar

References

Union councils of Sindh
Populated places in Sindh